Viile Satu Mare is a commune of 2,356 inhabitants situated in Satu Mare County, Romania. It is composed of five villages:

Demographics
Ethnic groups (2002 census): 
Hungarians: 46.11%
Romanians: 41.57%
Romanies (Gypsies): 11.69%

According to mother tongue, 47.62% speak Romanian as their first language, while 47.40% of the population speak Hungarian.

References

Communes in Satu Mare County